The Tamar Valley is a valley in Tasmania, Australia. It runs north-west from the northern city of Launceston to the coast either side of the Tamar River, a distance of approximately 50 km.

There are more than 20 vineyards lining the valley and tourists are guided by the Tamar Valley Wineroute. The main varieties of grapes grown are pinot noir and chardonnay.

The Tamar Valley is a Graben -  a depressed block of the crust bordered by parallel faults.

See also

Bell Bay Pulp Mill

References

External links
Tamar Valley tourism website

Tamar River